Tantulum elegans is a species of freshwater slug, an aquatic shell-less gastropod mollusk within the clade Acochlidiacea.

This species has no shell. The maximum recorded length is 2 mm.

Tantulum elegans is the only species in the genus Tantulum, and that is in turn the only genus in the family Tantulidae.

Taxonomy 
In 2005, Tantulidae was classified as the only family within the superfamily Hedylopsoidea in the taxonomy of Bouchet & Rocroi.

According to Schrödl & Neusser (2010) Tantulidae is in the clade Hedylopsacea.

Distribution 
This species occurs in the Caribbean island of Saint Vincent. It was collected at an altitude of 411.5 m.

Ecology 
Tantulum elegans are sequential hermaphrodites.

References

External links 
 http://www.malacolog.org/search.php?mode=details&waspid=5103

Tantulidae
Gastropods described in 1979